Photo Élysée, formerly known as Musée de l'Élysée, is a museum in Lausanne, Switzerland, entirely devoted to photography. It is a government-supported institution founded in 1985 by Charles-Henri Favrod. It was housed in an 18th-century mansion until October 2020.

The museum is temporarily closed from October 2020 until June 2022, as it is moving to a new building. The new building is designed by Portuguese architects Aires Mateus. It will merge with two other museums; the Cantonal Museum of Fine Arts and the Museum of Contemporary Design and Applied Arts

Collection 

The collection of more than 100,000 photographs covers the whole range of photographic history and technology from 19th century daguerreotypes to contemporary digital prints. Amongst others, it holds collections of works by Adolphe Braun, who worked at the court of Napoleon III, Gabriel Lippmann, Mario Giacomelli, Lucia Moholy, Gilles Caron and Pieter Hugo. 

The entire collections of Ella Maillart and Nicolas Bouvier were bequeathed to the museum. In 2011 it acquired Charlie Chaplin's collection of around 10,000 photographs. The museum also holds the collection of Pierre Gilliard, tutor to the children of Emperor Nicholas II of Russia.

Awards
2016: Lucie Award in Spotlight Award category

Notes and references

External links 

 
 YouTube Musée de l'Elysée short video tour

Museums in Lausanne
Photography museums and galleries in Switzerland
Art museums established in 1985
Photo Élysée